William Squire (1917–1989) was a Welsh actor.

William Squire may also refer to:

William Barclay Squire (1855–1927), British musicologist, librarian and librettist
William Henry Squire (1871–1963), British cellist and composer